Bhawarna is a town in Kangra district, Himachal Pradesh, India.  from Palampur. The postal code for Bhawarna is 176083.

Until the latter part of 1990s, the town market was one of the favorite destinations for marriage shopping since transportation was limited and people preferred the nearest market. With government initiatives and improved transportation, customers can now shop in bigger markets in Kangra for their marriage shopping. However, the Bhawarna market still retains its importance of being an important trading centre in nearby area. There are various food joints available in Bhawarna.

Overview

Bhawarna Khas is a small village located in Palampur Tehsil of Kangra district, Himachal Pradesh with total 317 families residing. The Bhawarna Khas village has population of 1,393 of which 695 are males, while 698 are females as per Population Census in 2011. 

In Bhawarna Khas, village population of children with age 0-6 is 135 which makes up 9.69 % of total population. Average Sex Ratio of Bhawarna Khas village is 1,004 which is higher than Himachal Pradesh state acreages of 972. Child Sex Ratio for the Bhawarna Khas as per census is 1,143-- higher than Himachal Pradesh average of 909. 

Bhawarna Khas village has higher literacy rate compared to Himachal Pradesh. In 2011, literacy rate of Bhawarna Khas village was 89.83 % compared to 82.80 % of Himachal Pradesh. In Bhawarna Khas, male literacy stands at 92.88 % while female literacy rate was 86.74 %. 
Schedule Caste (SC) constitutes 21.03 %, while Schedule Tribe (ST) were 1.15 % of total population in Bhawarna Khas village.

Bhawarna also has a government Senior Secondary school, which is one of the oldest in the nearby region. 
Various private schools in Bhawarna are Dhauladhar Convent School, Neugal Model Public School, ABM Senior Secondary school, Paras Public school, Angel public school, Tiny Tots School and Rainbow public school Bhawarna, Viveka foundations.
Bhawarna is also known as a market place and is famous around its neighbouring villages.

Now, it is growing day by day having more variety in showrooms, shopping destinations and play zones. Bhawarna has a police station that covers a large no. of panchayats, having community health centre and community hall. 
Due to its good geographical location, availability of school and vicinity to Railway station & Palampur, many people have migrated from interior locations to Bhawarna.

The Area has Lush green tea gardens which makes it more beautiful.

References

Villages in Kangra district